HNLMS Java may refer to following ships of the Royal Netherlands Navy:

 , a small unprotected cruiser
 , a 

Royal Netherlands Navy ship names